Trinity is an American comic book series published by DC Comics featuring the superheroes Superman, Batman and Wonder Woman. The first series was published weekly from 2008 to 2009. In 2016, a second monthly comic book series was launched by DC Comics.

Development
Busiek first pitched the idea in 2006 to Dan DiDio following the announcement of 52. His initial pitch involved a 12-page weekly book in which the first 7 pages were focused on an ongoing story with Superman, Batman and Wonder Woman, and the remaining 5 pages were used to promote the rest of the line. The book was planned to follow up 52, but will wound up being pushed back a year, and developing into a full 22-page book with two stories, and the promotional idea being dropped.

The series was the "mystery project" which had been mentioned by Kurt Busiek previously and was his reason for leaving Aquaman. Like 52, also by DC Comics, the series would last for 52 issues and would be self-contained.

One of the differences between Trinity and earlier weekly comics is that it features two stories: the first, a 12-page lead story by Busiek and Mark Bagley, and the second, a 10-page backup by Busiek and Fabian Nicieza while Tom Derenick, Scott McDaniel, Mike Norton and others, work on the art. The book marked Bagley's DC debut, after leaving a long tenure at Marvel Comics, which included 110 consecutive issues of Ultimate Spider-Man.

Trinity (first series)

The story begins with Superman, Batman, and Wonder Woman all experiencing the same dream. The dream is of someone screaming to be let out. After determining that none of the other heroes are having them, they reason that someone is attacking them directly. They start to hear the voice in the waking world too.

At the same time, a mysterious man calling himself Enigma approaches Morgaine le Fey, and tells her that the three heroes are a "trinity", keystones to the power of the universe itself (the keystone to the multiverse is the New Earth universe, this universe's keystone is Earth, and Earth's keystones are the Trinity), and convinces her to join him in taking their places by using a mystic ritual.

To achieve this goal they enlist Despero; as three are required to take the power of the Trinity, Enigma will seize Batman's place, Morgaine will take Wonder Woman's, and Despero will usurp Superman's. The three send out agents, such as countless Gotham City criminals and the inhuman Howlers, to steal items connected to the heroes and relics related to the Egyptian tarot. They also conspire to mark the heroes with mystic runes, obtain the Cosmic Egg containing an imprisoned Krona (which was formed at the conclusion of the DC/Marvel crossover JLA/Avengers), and abduct the mystic Tarot, who recently was revealed to have a connection to a power known as the "Worldsoul". Jose Delgado, also known as Gangbuster, teams up with the Justice League of America to find Tarot, as he was guarding her when she was taken and feels he should help in her rescue.

As she studies their targets, Morgaine realizes why each third of the Trinity holds his or her share of the power: Batman is the pinnacle of human achievements, physical and mental; Superman is the ultimate freedom fighter, with an absolute will; and Wonder Woman's message inspires all around her to do what is right to the end. She is also seen using Tarot's abilities with the cards to foresee the future to engineer her plans more strictly.

The Trinity take note of these strange occurrences and investigate, along with the Justice League, Justice Society of America and Gangbuster. Meanwhile, they are occupied fighting an alien creature, Konvikt, who, after being nearly beaten by Green Lantern John Stewart, gets cocky when Stewart falls into a seizure and generates massive guns to attack him, by means unrelated to his ring, muttering in binary data. Stewart later relapses and again resumes speaking in binary and generating blades when explaining the origins of the Cosmic Egg and Krona to the new Firestorm. Wonder Woman is marked by a Howler, who promptly dies. The machinery keeping watch on the Egg is broken, the Dark Trinity (Enigma, Morgaine, Despero) having seized it by means of Despero. The power of the Egg is used to draw dreamers from around the globe and infusing them with power, creating the Dreambound. Simultaneously, Morgaine starts preparing a massive reality-warping spell, using Lois Lane's notebook, Lex Luthor's blood, the Space Shuttle Superman saved in his first public appearance, Jim Gordon's pipe, the Joker's laughter, cement from Crime Alley, Etta Candy's security card, Maxwell Lord's skull, and the magic clay used to animate Wonder Woman as focusing points; this stems from Tarot's predictions to power up the spell, requiring a part of the origin, an enemy and an ally of each hero.

The Riddler (Edward Nigma) is employed to investigate the thefts. The encounters with the Penguin and Mr. Freeze, who seem convinced he is the one ordering the thefts, convince him to explore the magical angle. He consults with Madame Zodiac in order to uncover the secret behind the mysterious crimes. While there, a priceless gargoyle from Castle Branek comes to life and attempts to kill him for "betraying the cause". He later sends a letter to his employer, Nightwing, saying that the person who was committing the crimes must be Edward Nigma, but, as he is innocent, he has no idea of what to make out of it.

The JLA departs to the antimatter universe, where they force their counterparts, the Crime Syndicate of America, to release countless prisoners they have taken from many worlds. The Trinity, by then, is starting to feel the ritual's effects and each member starts taking on different personality traits as their minds are woven together. John Stewart's powers are revealed to come from a Qwardian superweapon he absorbed, the Void Hound, that is trying to escape containment by indirectly harming Stewart, as it slowly gains more power above him and his ring. While the JLA is successful in containing the CSA, the antimatter Earth falls into chaos, and they leave before the situation worsens. Soon after this, Superman is marked by another Howler.

Their search takes them to Morgaine le Fey's base in Castle Branek, where the ritual is beginning, and attempt to stop the evil trio. The presence of the Trinity allows them to brand Batman, the final requirement to finish the spell, and with it complete, the world is changed. In this new world, Batman, Superman and Wonder Woman never existed, and the Justice Society International patrols the world, with a ban in place on all non-licensed heroes. The inhabitants of Earth have only fleeting memories of how the world once was. The only one spared from the change is Firestorm, who was in Negative Space at the time, investigating the theft of the Cosmic Egg. Even Tarot and Gangbuster, who had managed to escape from the villain's headquarters, are affected and seek help from Alfred Pennyworth, who is now a retired OSS agent who makes a living as an archeologist in the mountains surrounding the castle.

Firestorm then seeks John Stewart, who has to hide his status as a Green Lantern from the general populace, as the JSI have placed a ban on all Green Lanterns from Earth. Suddenly, the Void Hound again strikes and Stewart flees Earth. Meanwhile, Firestorm is targeted by the JSI and forcefully separated into Jason Rusch and Gehenna. Pennyworth gives Gangbuster and Tarot a scroll to be handed over to Hawkman, the leader of the JSI. The history of the scroll shows it was forged in Nth metal by Prince Khufu, one of Hawkman's previous incarnations. When handed over and inspected by Hawkman, Jay Garrick and Alan Scott of the JSI, the scroll imbues them with renewed vitality and reveals to them that time was warped by the powers of the spell, and they set out to make things right, starting by fusing together Jason and Gehenna.

The villains come out of the ritual with power close to that of gods, only to discover that Despero had been replaced from the very beginning by a disguised Kanjar Ro. Also, a new Trinity has been formed in the alternate world, consisting of Black Adam as a stand-in for Superman, Tomorrow Woman filling in Wonder Woman's role, and Green Arrow now becoming Gotham's protector, and later due to a ripple in reality the role is turned over from Green Arrow and Speedy to Ragman and Tatters. As all of this takes place, Krona escapes the Cosmic Egg and seeks the aid of the Controllers to contact the consciousness of the universe itself, but is betrayed and instead destroys their laboratory planet when the Controllers attempt to restrain him and drain his energies for study. Upon doing this, he hears the planet's consciousness say "freed". Krona leaves to do the same for as many planets as he can.

However, his is not the only case: reality seems to be unstable and some special people keep seeing visions of either how reality is supposed to be, or alternate worlds continually overlapping (all of this due to Kanjar Ro's substitution of Despero, in a bid to seize the power promised to him). Tomorrow Woman starts acting strangely and evaporates or duplicates, bus stations keep changing to airports, train stations, spaceports or Wild West saloons. Tarot goes to Opal City, where her cards show that she will be helped. There, she finds Charity O'Dare, a fellow tarot mystic, and is instructed on the power of the Worldsoul-a bond linking a human to the living spirit of Earth. She realizes she needs to help fix the situation or she will die along with Earth. Morgaine and Enigma, bickering about their usage of power, agree to find Despero and complete the ritual. As a replacement for the Cosmic Egg's power, Morgaine finds a new source of energy for her incantation-the Major Arcana of the Tarot.

Konvikt gets lost after receiving power from Graak, a tiny alien who accompanied him, and, acting upon the knowledge of that he kills an innocent civilian during his first confrontation with the Justice League, and attempts to reach to the killed man's family to offer himself as a willing slave as penance, but in the restructured world, the man never died. This leaves Konvikt at a loss, given how he has remained unaffected by Morgaine's spell. He then remembers how he ended up in his situation: he was an employee for a powerful man in his world and had been falling in love with the man's daughter. When the girl was killed, Konvikt was blamed. He was sentenced to exile, before he was even allowed to attempt to atone; the ship that led him to Earth was an escape pod from the ship driving him to exile, having malfunctioned during its journey; Graak is revealed as his former lawyer. Enigma appears, offering a position in the new order and the possibility to reshape reality so the man he killed in the former timeline remains living or dead, or changing his timeline altogether. Konvikt takes the chance to replace Despero as a stand-in for Superman and accepts Enigma's offer, remaking the Dark Trinity.

Alfred realizes as well he is part of a larger group, one needed to bring back the true Trinity. He gathers Richie Grayson, an embittered mobster, Lois Lane, an aggressive shock reporter, Tom Tresser, outlaw and vigilante extraordinaire, and Kara In-Ze, Interceptor of the JSI, and tells the group they were better people in another world, relating himself and Grayson to the world's greatest detective, Lois and Interceptor to the world's mightiest hero, and Tresser to a great warrior. All agree to hear him out and find the last member of the cabal, Donna Troy, now living as a librarian in Virginia.

As all of this happens, the Dreambound awaken inside a JSI prison and recreate their fallen teammate, Sun-Chained-in-Ink, from the Tattooed Man. As he, the Trans-Volitional Man, the Swashbuckler and Primat escape, they are again recruited by Enigma and Morgaine, along with most of the detainees at the JSI prison. In space, the Void Hound takes control of Stewart's ring and opens a black hole leading to Earth after constructing a new body for itself from Stewart's own body and Oan and Qwardian technologies; at the same time, Kanjar Ro is captured by Despero to be punished for his bid of power. In exchange for leniency, he offers Despero the location of the captured CSA to add to his army. Despero then starts marshaling his forces through the black hole Stewart left.

Alfred and his group go to the Happy Harbor cave in which the JLA was first based. They perform a ritual of their own, which allows them to recover the memories of the vanished Earth. They are then transported to a different world. Below them is a town of aliens in a Middle Ages civilization. They witness the judgment of a thief in which a Sunlord, a Truthlord and a Nightlord decide the fate of the thief. When Alfred and the group turn around they see the mountain face surrounding the village has been carved with giant likenesses of Batman, Wonder Woman, and Superman. The group starts moving and joins the town on a pilgrimage, accepted after saving two towns from a bloody confrontation. Every night during the course of the pilgrimage a different part of a story is told; it turn out the world they appeared in is the world contained within the Cosmic Egg. The Pilgrims tell the story of what life was like with Krona as their god. After several generation of following Krona's every order, they are abandoned by him when he is released. The people of the planet are all about to kill themselves, when Batman, Wonder Woman, and Superman arrive. The three of them helped the planet rebuild itself in Krona's wake, teaching them about beauty, hope, justice, mercy, etc., in the process becoming that reality's Trinity and assuming power as gods. As all of this takes place, Tomorrow Woman has revived herself by sheer willpower and saved Metropolis, but in exchange releases dangerous, immensely powerful world-shattering rifts all through Earth.

Meanwhile, villains from all over the DC universe are being gathered by Morgaine. The Space Ranger spies for the JSI, but is discovered and has to abandon his mission. Luckily the Atom, who was hiding out on Space Ranger's clothes, is able to drop off before Space Ranger leaves, and acts as the spy instead. When asked why so many villains are being gathered, Morgaine and Enigma reveal that their first plan to rebuild the Earth the way they wanted it did not work, so now they are gathering villains that will fit into the Major Arcana so they can bring their own order to this new world. When Hawkman hears this, he realizes what he has to do. Without realizing it, he had figured out what heroes would fit into the Major Arcana as well to form a team to oppose Morgaine. He thought it was just an obsession and never finished it, but now knows it was to counteract Enigma and Morgaine's plans. On his dismay, he is having a hard time figuring out the rest of the Major Arcana. Charity offers to help him figure it out.

Morgaine's plans consist of sealing the major world-shifting rifts to drain their power; the team who first reaches the rifts and seals them leaves with the acquired power, assuming the power of three cards. The JSI loses the first rift to Lady Shiva, Zoom and Polaris in London, but as Charity proves she can sense the readings Tarot is doing for the Dark Trinity, the Tomorrow Woman, Flash and Green Arrow manage to drain the energy of the following rift in Brazil. Meanwhile, the Friends (Alfred's group) hear a story from the Pilgrims as to how Atmahn, the Night Judge (the god-like form of Batman within the Egg) once rescued a child whose family had been killed, empowering him to fight back criminals, giving him the name of Rabat of the Golden Wing. Those who had rejected the order the Judge brought had formed the Laughing Chaos, and it beat Rabat to death. The Friends realize it is a retelling of Jason Todd's death at the Joker's hands.

Major Arcana
To usurp the Trinity's power, the Dark Trinity form a coalition of villains according to the Major Arcana. The Justice Society International follows suit by combining forces with Barry Allen's underground organization of heroes to oppose them.

Dark Arcana

 Punch and Jewelee (The Fool) later dropped in favor of the Joker)
 Enigma (The Magician)
 Morgaine le Fey (The High Priestess)
 Lady Shiva (The Empress)
 Khyber (The Emperor)
 Ra's al Ghul (The Hierophant)
 Catman and Catwoman (The Lovers)
 Zoom (The Chariot)
 Konvikt (Justice)
 Brainiac (The Hermit)
 The Royal Flush Gang (Wheel of Fortune)
 Giganta (Strength)
 Gentleman Ghost (The Hanged Man)
 Solomon Grundy (Death)
 Prometheus (Temperance)
 Deathstroke (The Devil)
 Ultraman
 Owlman
 Superwoman
 Johnny Quick
 Power Ring
 Vandal Savage (The Tower)
 Cheetah (The Star)
 Scarecrow (The Moon)
 Sun-Chained-in-Ink (The Sun)
 Doctor Polaris (Judgement)
 Floronic Man (The World)
 The Dreambound (the Trans-Volitional Man/T.V.M., the Swashbuckler and Primat)
 The Joker (second Fool of the Dark Arcana)
 Gorilla Grodd
 Eclipso
 Brimstone
 Parasite
 Queen Bee
 Shrapnel
 Mr. Nobody (considered a replacement for the Fool)
 Despero
 Clayface
 Kanjar Ro
 T.O. Morrow
 Amazo

Justice Arcana

 Plastic Man (The Fool)
 The Phantom Stranger (The Magician)
 Raven (The High Priestess)
 The Tomorrow Woman (The Empress)
 Aquaman (The Emperor)
 Lex Luthor (The Hierophant) 
 Hawkman and Hawkgirl (The Lovers)
 The Flash (The Chariot)
 Triumph (Strength)
 The Space Ranger (The Hermit) (secretly the Martian Manhunter)
 The Gangbuster (Wheel of Fortune)
 The Ragman (Justice)
 Deadman (The Hanged Man)
 The Crimson Avenger (Death)
 Mister Terrific (Temperance)
 Booster Gold (The Devil)
 Cyborg (The Tower)
 Starfire (The Star)
 The Black Orchid (The Moon) (replaced by Nightshade)
 Firestorm (The Sun)
 The Green Arrow (Judgement)
 Geo-Force (The World) (replaced by Sandmaster)
 The Flash
 Green Lantern
 Black Adam
 Skyrocket
 The Atom Smasher
 Power Girl
 Brainwave
 The Red Tornado
 Stargirl
 Nightshade (replacement for The Moon)
 Black Lightning
 The Hourman
 Metamorpho
 Congorilla
 Sand (replacement for The World as Sandmaster)
 Vixen
 Citizen Steel
 Doctor Mid-Nite
 The Black Canary
 Zatanna

Trinity (second series)

In 2016, as part of DC Rebirth, DC Comics launched a second Trinity comic book series featuring Superman, Batman, and Wonder Woman. The series was launched in September and ended in April 2018 with 22 issues and one Annual. Writers who worked on the series include Francis Manapul, Rob Williams and James Robinson.

Collected editions

DC editions
The first series has been collected into three trade paperbacks:
Volume 1: collects Trinity #1-17 (416 pages)
Titan Books edition (July 2009)
DC Comics edition (2009-05-27, /)
Volume 2: collects Trinity #18-35 (424 pages)
Titan Books edition (September 2009)
DC Comics edition (2009-08-26, /)
Volume 3: collects Trinity #36-52 (424 pages)
DC Comics edition (2009-10-14, /)

The second series includes:
Trinity Vol.1 Better Together: collects Trinity #1-6.
hardcover (2017-06-07)
softcover (2017-12-13)
Trinity Vol.2 Dead Space: collects Trinity #7-11.
hardcover (2017-12-13)
softcover (2018-06-20)
Trinity Vol.3 Dark Destiny: collects Trinity #12-16, Annual #1.
softcover (2018-07-25)
Trinity Vol.4 The Search for Steve Trevor: collects Trinity #17-22.
softcover (2018-12-05)

Planeta DeAgostini Comics editions
Trinidad 1 De 3 (2009-05-??): Spanish version of Trinity (2008) Volume 1.
Trinidad 2 De 3 (2009-12-??): Spanish version of Trinity (2008) Volume 2.
Trinidad 3 De 3 (2010-10-??): Spanish version of Trinity (2008) Volume 3.

ECC Cómics editions
Trinidad Parte 1 (2017-10-03): Spanish version of Trinity (2008) #1-13.
Trinidad Parte 2 (2018-01-30): Spanish version of Trinity (2008) #14-26.
Trinidad Parte 3 (2018-04-10): Spanish version of Trinity (2008) #27-39.
Trinidad Parte 4 (2018-10-16): Spanish version of Trinity (2008) #40-52.

References

External links
DC page: T2008, T2016

Annotations: Trinity #1 at Newsarama

Reviews
Trinity #1 Trinity #2 at Comics Bulletin

Batman titles
Superman titles
Wonder Woman titles
Comics by Fabian Nicieza
Comics by Kurt Busiek
Defunct American comics